The Benjamin Wellington House is a historic house in Waltham, Massachusetts. The -story wood-frame house was built c. 1810 by Benjamin Wellington, and is one of the city's few Federal style house with brick end-walls. The house is a well-proportioned five bays wide and three deep, with paired chimneys on each of the gable ends. A single-story porch with Tuscan columns wraps around two sides of the house. The Wellingtons, early settlers of the area, only acquired this farmstead (with surrounding farmlands) by marriage in the early 19th century.

The house was listed on the National Register of Historic Places in 1989.

See also
National Register of Historic Places listings in Waltham, Massachusetts

References

Houses on the National Register of Historic Places in Waltham, Massachusetts
Houses in Waltham, Massachusetts
Federal architecture in Massachusetts
Houses completed in 1810